The U sets were a type of electric multiple unit operated by the New South Wales Government Railways and its successors between September 1958 and November 1996. They were nicknamed U-boats.

Development
The New South Wales Government Railways began planning the electrification of the Main Western line over the Blue Mountains from 1949, and with that plan in full swing by the early 1950s, called tenders for 80 cars (40 motor, 20 trailer and 20 first with buffet trailer), with the contract was awarded to Commonwealth Engineering, Granville in 1954. Electric traction equipment was supplied by the Metropolitan-Vickers, Manchester. However, before construction began the order was amended with the 20 planned first with buffet cars built as full first class seating cars, after a review of the New South Wales Government Railways conducted by American firm Ebasco Services Incorporated in the mid-1950s recommended the change.

The U sets were a bit different compared to the suburban single decked trains that were delivered at the same time. They were the first EMUs in NSW to feature stainless-steel construction using technology from the Budd Company, improving train acceleration and giving the trains lower maintenance costs and a longer usable life.

Delivery
The U Sets started to be delivered from June 1957, and the first sets made their first public appearances that same year. The first appearance took place on 22 June 1957 when they were hauled by electric locomotive 4625 as part of the first official electric train to travel on the newly electrified Blue Mountains line. Normal services began on 15 September 1958, and all were in service by March 1960.

The cars were numbered as:
Second-class Motor Cars: CF 5001-40
Second-class Trailer Cars: TF 6001-20
First-class (non-smoking) Trailer Cars: ETB 6021-40

First class travel was abolished on 1 September 1974. This saw the removal of the word "Second" on all carriages and also allowed non-first class passengers to enjoy the benefits of non-smoking carriages for the first time.

In service
The U sets initially entered revenue service on 15 September 1958 this being a Sydney Terminal to Mount Victoria service which was then known as "The Fish". The U sets initially operated on the Main Western line as far as Bowenfels which was the limit of the electrified system at the time. This was cut back to Lithgow in 1974. As the electrified network expanded they began to operate to Gosford (23 January 1960), Wyong (April 1982), Newcastle (June 1984), Port Kembla (February 1986) and Dapto (January 1993). The U sets were supplemented by V set double deck sets from 1970.

From the mid-1970s many had their original lift-up windows replaced by Beclawat sliding windows.

Withdrawal and preservation
Withdrawal of the sets began in 1994 as new Tangara G sets began replacing them. The first Tangara G sets entered service in June 1994 and as they were progressively put into service through to late 1995 the U sets were progressively withdrawn. The final run of the U sets on the Main Western Line for Blue Mountains services was in late February 1996 after which they only performed revenue services on the Northern Line between Sydney and Newcastle. The very last U Sets were withdrawn in early November 1996. The final revenue service performed by a U set was on Friday afternoon 1 November 1996 – a four car set operating a Newcastle to Sydney service.
The cars on the final passenger service were
CF5008 TF6004 TF6020 CF5008. 

The final U set to run under its own power was a Sydney Electric Train Society Farewell tour two days later on the Sunday 3 November 1996 performed by an eight car set.

A number of U Set carriages have been preserved.:. Most of the cars allocated to the Hunter Valley Railway Trust were scrapped in 2013, excepting CF 5001. Richmond Vale Railway lost cars TF 6001/02 and ETB 6026 in a bushfire in 2017.

A preserved U set appeared in Guy Sebastian's "Standing with you" in 2020.
Sydney Trains Heritage Collection in custody of Historic Electric Traction at Redfern: CF5015-ETB6029-TF6013-CF5017 and CF5035. Early work (as of May 2021) is commencing to restore heritage set "U2" to operation. 
Sydney Electric Train Society: CFs 5001, 5003, 5021 & 5022, TF 6010 and ETB 6037. While not part of the official collection, SETS members also have CFs 5006 and 5010, TF 6006 and ETB 6038 (the cars are held at Lithgow, Rothbury North and Molong)
Valley Heights Locomotive Depot Heritage Museum: ETB 6039
Dorrigo Steam Railway & Museum: CFs 5004, 5024
Glenreagh Mountain Railway: TFs 6004, 6005, 6014 & 6020 and ETBs 6031 & 6035
Richmond Vale Railway Museum: TFs 6008, 6009, 6011, 6012 & 6019

References

External links
SETS article on the U sets

Electric multiple units of New South Wales
Train-related introductions in 1958
1500 V DC multiple units of New South Wales